The 2008–09 season was SC Rheindorf Altach's 80th season in existence and the club's 3rd consecutive season in the top flight of Austrian football. In addition to the domestic league, Altach participated in this season's edition of the Austrian Cup.

First-team squad
Squad at end of season

Left club during season

Competitions

Bundesliga

League table

References

SC Rheindorf Altach seasons
SC Rheindorf Altach